Tame Valley may refer to:

Tame Valley Canal, a canal in the English Midlands
Tame Valley Junction, junction where the Tame Valley Canal meets the Walsall Canal
Tame Valley, geographical area surrounding the River Tame, West Midlands, between Birmingham and Tamworth
Tame Valley Industrial Estate, Tamworth

See also
Teme Valley